Han Sun-hi (born 3 May 1955) is a North Korean Olympic archer. She represented her country in the women's individual competition at the 1976 Summer Olympics. She came 10th place after both rounds, finishing with 2347 points. She won a bronze medal at the 1978 Asian Games in the women's team event.

References

1955 births
Living people
North Korean female archers
Olympic archers of North Korea
Archers at the 1976 Summer Olympics
Asian Games medalists in archery
Archers at the 1978 Asian Games
Asian Games bronze medalists for North Korea
Medalists at the 1978 Asian Games
20th-century North Korean women